The 2022 Fiesta Bowl was a college football bowl game played on January 1, 2022, with kickoff at 1:00 p.m. EST (10:00 a.m. PST) and televised on ESPN. It was the 51st edition of the Fiesta Bowl, and was one of the 2021–22 bowl games concluding the 2021 FBS football season. After rallying from a 28-7 deflict late in the 2nd quarter, Oklahoma State defeated Notre Dame 37-35. Sponsored by video game brand PlayStation, the game was officially known as the PlayStation Fiesta Bowl.

Teams
As one of the New Year's Six bowl games, the participants of the game were determined by the College Football Playoff Selection Committee.

This was the first time that Notre Dame and Oklahoma State have ever played each other. After the win, Oklahoma State now leads the series 1-0.

Notre Dame Fighting Irish
Notre Dame finished their regular season with an 11–1 overall record, losing only to Cincinnati in early October. The Fighting Irish defeated one ranked team, Wisconsin, and entered the Fiesta Bowl ranked fifth in all major polls. After beating Stanford in the last game of the regular season, Brian Kelly left to take the job at LSU and Defensive Coordinator Marcus Freeman was promoted to head coach shortly less than a week later

Oklahoma State Cowboys
Led by head coach Mike Gundy in his 17th season, Oklahoma State entered the season with a narrow defeat of FCS-ranked Missouri State. They followed up with another narrow comeback win against Tulsa after scoring three touchdowns in the fourth quarter alone, and then took to the road for their first away game against Boise State, which resulted in a one-point win for the Cowboys. They faced their first conference opponent the following week, No. 25 Kansas State, and the Cowboys pulled the upset to move to 4–0 and jump into the rankings at No. 19. Oklahoma State then faced No. 21 Baylor, whom they defeated by ten points, which led into a bye week. The Cowboys then traveled to No. 25 Texas, overcoming an early deficit to win by eight and vault themselves into the top ten, at No. 8. Another road game saw Oklahoma State drop their first game of the year, as they lost to Iowa State by three points. The Cowboys rebounded with a dominant win over Kansas, and held West Virginia to a field goal the following week in a three-touchdown win. They continued on their win streak with another dominant win, this time over TCU, and followed with a shutout win in their final away game of the season against Texas Tech; this victory clinched them a spot in the championship game. The Cowboys ended their regular season with an 8–1 record in Big 12 games, finishing with a four-point home win against No. 10 Oklahoma, their first win in the rivalry series since an overtime victory in 2014. In the Big 12 Championship Game, Oklahoma State lost a rematch against Baylor, 21–16. Oklahoma State entered the Fiesta Bowl with an overall 11–2 record.

Game summary

Statistics

References

External links
 Game statistics at statbroadcast.com

Fiesta Bowl
Fiesta Bowl
Notre Dame Fighting Irish football bowl games
Oklahoma State Cowboys football bowl games
Fiesta Bowl
Fiesta Bowl